× Haagespostoa is a hybrid genus of cacti, a natural hybrid between Haageocereus and Espostoa, exclusively found in Peru. Backeberg took this taxon for a new genus, and described it as Neobinghamia. According to Ostolaza (Quepo 2009), five taxa are known, all situated west of the Andes.

The genus × Haagespostoa is in the family Cactaceae in the major group Angiosperms (Flowering plants).

Habitat 
The genus × Haagespostoa grows endemically in Peru on mountainous slopes in rocky masses, in ravines (quebradas) and valleys, between 300 m and 1820 m in altitude. Populations are obviously rare and limited.

Distribution 
Peru (Ancash, Lambayeque, Lima)

References 

Haageocereus
Trichocereeae
Cactoideae genera
Plant nothogenera